The 2000 Austrian Figure Skating Championships took place on 12 December 1999 in Vienna. Skaters competed in the disciplines of men's singles, ladies' singles, and ice dancing. The results were used to choose the Austrian teams to the 2000 World Championships and the 2000 European Championships.

Senior results

Men

Ladies

Ice dancing

External links
 results

Austrian Figure Skating Championships
1999 in figure skating
Austrian Figure Skating Championships, 2000
Figure skating